The 1894 Ontario general election was the eighth general election held in the Province of Ontario, Canada.  It was held on June 26, 1894, to elect the 94 Members of the 8th Legislative Assembly of Ontario ("MLAs").

The main issues were the Liberals' "Ontario System", as well as French language schools, farmer interests, support for Toronto business, woman suffrage, the temperance movement, and the demands of labour unions.

The Ontario Liberal Party, led by Oliver Mowat, formed the government for the seventh consecutive parliament, even though some of its members were elected under joint banners: either with the Patrons of Industry or the Protestant Protective Association.

The Ontario Conservative Party, led by William Ralph Meredith, formed the official opposition.

The Patrons of Industry, a farmers' organization formed in 1890, cooperated with the urban labour movement to address the political frustrations of both groups with big business.  Sixteen members of the Legislative Assembly were elected with Patrons of Industry support—12 Liberals, one Conservative, and three who ran only under the "Patrons of Industry" banner.

The Protestant Protective Association (PPA)  was an anti-Catholic group, associated with the Orange Order. It campaigned against the rights of Catholics and French-Canadians, and argued that Roman Catholics were attempting to take over Ontario. Nine candidates were elected with PPA support, 6 Conservatives, 1 Liberal and 2 who ran only under the PPA banner. The PPA worked most closely with the Conservative opposition.

Unlike the previous two elections, this election strictly used First past the post to elect the members. The Toronto district was divided into separate single member districts, as part of the expansion of the Assembly.

Expansion of the Legislative Assembly
An Act passed just prior to the election increased the size of the Assembly from 91 to 94 seats:

 Toronto, a riding that returned three MLAs, was divided into Toronto East, Toronto North, Toronto South and Toronto West.
 Hamilton, a single-member constituency, was divided into Hamilton East and Hamilton West.
 Ottawa became a two-member riding.

Results

|-
! colspan=2 rowspan=2 | Political party
! rowspan=2 | Party leader
! colspan=5 | MPPs
! colspan=3 | Votes
|-
! Candidates
!1890
!Dissol.
!1894
!±
!#
!%
! ± (pp)

|style="text-align:left;"|Oliver Mowat
|80
|53
|
|45
|8
|153,826
|40.99%
|8.64

|style="text-align:left;"|William Ralph Meredith
|56
|34
|
|23
|11
|104,369
|27.81%
|12.07

|style="text-align:left;"|Liberal-Patrons
|style="text-align:left;"|
|26
|–
|–
|12
|12
|44,029
|11.73%
|

|style="text-align:left;"|Conservative–P.P.A.
|style="text-align:left;"|
|13
|–
|–
|5
|5
|24,616
|6.56%
|

|style="text-align:left;"|Joseph Longford Haycock
|7
|–
|–
|3
|3
|10,465
|2.79%
|

|style="text-align:left;"|Conservative-Patrons
|style="text-align:left;"|
|7
|–
|–
|2
|2
|11,608
|3.09%
|

|style="text-align:left;"|Liberal-P.P.A.
|style="text-align:left;"|
|2
|–
|–
|2
|2
|3,649
|0.97%
|
|-
|style="background-color:#FF8000;"|
|style="text-align:left;"|Protestant Protective Association
|style="text-align:left;"|
|8
|–
|–
|1
|1
|11,015
|2.94%
|

|style="text-align:left;"|
|1
|–
|–
|1
|1
|2,326
|0.62%
|

|style="text-align:left;"|
|9
|–
|–
|–
|
|9,374
|2.50%
|

|style="text-align:left;"|Liberal-Equal Rights 
|style="text-align:left;"|
|
|2
|–
|–
|2
|colspan="3"|Did not campaign

|style="text-align:left;"|Conservative-Equal Rights
|style="text-align:left;"|
|
|2
|–
|–
|2
|colspan="3"|Did not campaign

|colspan="3"|
|
|colspan="5"|
|-style="background:#E9E9E9;"
|colspan="3" style="text-align:left;"|Total
|209
|91
|91
|94
|
|375,277
|100.00%
|
|-
|colspan="8" style="text-align:left;"|Blank and invalid ballots
|align="right"|3,886
|style="background:#E9E9E9;" colspan="2"|
|-style="background:#E9E9E9;"
|colspan="8" style="text-align:left;"|Registered voters / turnout
|539,358
|70.30%
|0.70
|}

Before the Legislature's first session opened, four by-elections were called. William Ralph Meredith (London) resigned to accept appointment as a judge, while the elections of James M. Savage (Algoma West), John Senn (Haldimand) and Edward H. Smythe (Kingston) were overturned on appeal. The Liberals won all four Conservative seats, thus securing a majority in the Assembly. That, together with the inability of the Patrons of Industry and the Conservatives to combine on any issue, ensured the Liberals' hold on power.

Division of ridings
The newly created ridings returned the following MLAs:

Seats that changed hands

Of the constituencies that were not altered, there were 38 seats that changed allegiance in the election:

Liberal to Conservative
Algoma West
Haldimand
Perth North
York West

Liberal to Liberal/Patrons of Industry
Bruce Centre
Middlesex North
Parry Sound
Perth South
Glengarry
Prince Edward
Stormont

Liberal to Conservative/PPA
Lambton West
Durham West
Wellington West

Liberal to Patrons of Industry
Grey South

Liberal to Independent-Conservative/PPA
 Lambton East

 Conservative to Liberal
Algoma East
Brockville
Essex North
Ontario North
Renfrew North
Welland

Conservative to Liberal/Patrons of Industry
Hastings East
Kent West
Elgin West
Frontenac
Simcoe West

Conservative to Conservative/PPA
Muskoka

Conservative to Patrons of Industry
Hastings North

Conservative to Conservative/Patrons of Industry
Cardwell
Carleton

Conservative to Liberal/PPA
Bruce North
Middlesex East

Conservative to PPA
Grey Centre

Liberal/Equal Rights to Liberal
Victoria West

Liberal/Equal Rights to Conservative
Lanark North

Conservative/Equal Rights to Conservative
Durham East

Conservative/Equal Rights to Patrons of Industry
Dufferin

See also
Politics of Ontario
List of Ontario political parties
Premier of Ontario
Leader of the Opposition (Ontario)

References

1894
1894 elections in Canada
1894 in Ontario
June 1894 events